Thuvayal Thavam, an act of ritual washing of one's physique and clothes along with practice of self-abnegation and self-restraint, was a practice in the religion Ayyavazhi, following the rules and regulations of Thuvayal Thavasu, held during the mid-nineteenth century in Vakaippathi according to Akilathirattu Ammanai the source of Ayyavazhi mythology.

Ayyavazhi
Ritual purification